Toni Yates (born 1963) is an American news reporter and anchorwoman who currently works for Eyewitness News WABC-TV as their New Jersey reporter. She joined the station from WPHL-TV WB17 where she was a news anchor and reporter since 1994. She left the station in December 2005. 
Yates is Eyewitness News' New Jersey Reporter, usually seen at Noon, 5PM or 6PM. Most recently, she reported on Jersey City cops and firefighters ending up on the wrong side of the law and the effects it has had on the departments and the public's trust.

Toni Yates was born and raised in Jacksonville, Florida, where she graduated from Bishop Kenny High School. She is a proud Seminole, having graduated from Florida State University with a major in communications.

Toni started her career in Savannah, Georgia, first as a reporter at WTOC, then with WSAV as weekend co-anchor. She has twice returned to her hometown where she was a reporter for WTLV, and during a second stint reporter weekend co-anchor for WJXT.

She also held two jobs in Norfolk, Virginia, delivering morning news while working a second job as Communications Director for the March Of Dimes.

Toni moved farther up the east coast, landing a General Assignment reporter job at WGAL in Lancaster, Pennsylvania. She came to WABC after spending several years at WB 17 in Philadelphia, where she was promoted from weekend anchor-medical reporter to weekday anchor.

Toni has three children, Austyn, Alexis, and Gabriel. She lives in New Jersey, and is a member of the National Association of Black Journalists. Through most of her career, Toni has been involved with the Girl Scouts.

Toni also regularly fills in as a co-anchor for Eyewitness News Saturday and Sunday Mornings, either for Phil Lipof or Michelle Charlesworth.

Toni's first assignment on WABC-TV was on Tropical Storm Beryl.  Toni Yates hosted the Opening Reception of The Philadelphia Black Gay Pride's 5th Annual when she was a WB 17 News Anchor.

References

American television news anchors
New York (state) television reporters
Living people
1963 births
People from Jacksonville, Florida
Florida State University alumni
Bishop Kenny High School alumni